Niels Overweg (born 15 May 1948) is a Dutch former professional footballer, who played as a defender for DWS, Go Ahead Eagles, FC Twente and DS'79. He was capped four times for the Netherlands national team. After retiring from play, he was also active as manager.

Club career
At the age of nineteen, in the 1967–68 season, Overweg became part of the first team of Eredivisie club DWS. In his first year with the Amsterdam-based club, the defender made fifteen appearances, but was not yet a regular in the squad. In the following year, Overweg made his breakthrough and from then on always played more than 31 league games per season. During this time, the defender also gained his first international experience by taking part in the Inter-Cities Fairs Cup.

In 1972, after DWS merged with Blauw-Wit to form FC Amsterdam, Overweg moved to fellow league side Go Ahead Eagles. Although he was always a regular for the club, there were no successes under either Barry Hughes (1972–73 season) or Jan Notermans (1973–74 season).

With the change to FC Twente in 1974, Overweg made an important step in his career. Although good competition meant he had to fight for his starting place there, he played most of the matches. In his seven years in Enschede, FC Twente reached fourth place in the Eredivisie three times. In the 1976–77 season, they won the KNVB Cup by defeating PEC Zwolle 3–0 in the final. Two years earlier, Overweg had also reached the final with FC Twente, but lost 1–0 against FC Den Haag. In the same season, they also reached the final of the UEFA Cup, played against the German team Borussia Mönchengladbach. After a 0–0 away game, FC Twente lost 5–1 on home soil. Overweg was on the field for both matches.

In the summer of 1981, Overweg moved to Eerste Divisie side DS'79. After two seasons, he ended his active career.

International career
In 1975, Overweg was called up to the Netherlands national team by head coach George Knobel. He made his debut on 17 May 1975 against West Germany, as a substitute at halftime for Frans Thijssen. The match ended in 1–1. For his performance in his fourth international match, a 4–1 defeat against Poland, Overweg was strongly criticized, and he subsequently received no further call-ups.

Managerial career
After his playing career, Overweg went into coaching. In 1987, he managed Vitesse; earlier he had been assistant to Hans Dorjee. Three years later, Overweg became the coach of Telstar from Velsen. In the summer of 1993, he was replaced by Simon Kistemaker. In the 1994–95 season, Overweg was appointed as interim manager of Cambuur after the departure of Fritz Korbach. Soon after, he was replaced by Han Berger. Later, he was also active as youth coach for Cambuur. In 2006, Overweg managed the amateur team of SC Franeker.

Honours
FC Twente
 KNVB Cup: 1976–77; runner-up 1974–75
 UEFA Cup runner-up: 1974–75

DS'79
 Eerste Divisie: 1982–83

References

External links
 
 
 profile on twentefiles.nl

1948 births
Living people
Dutch footballers
Footballers from Amsterdam
Association football defenders
Netherlands international footballers
Eredivisie players
Eerste Divisie players
AFC DWS players
Go Ahead Eagles players
FC Twente players
FC Dordrecht players
Dutch football managers
Eerste Divisie managers
SBV Vitesse managers
SC Telstar managers
SC Cambuur managers